Estadio Parque Artigas Las Piedras is a multi-use stadium in Las Piedras, Uruguay.  It is currently used mostly for football matches. It is the home stadium of Juventud de Las Piedras  The stadium holds 12,000 people and was built in 2002.

References

Juventud de Las Piedras
Sports venues completed in 2002
Parque Artigas las Piedras
Parque Artigas las Piedras
Buildings and structures in Canelones Department
2002 establishments in Uruguay
Las Piedras, Uruguay
José Gervasio Artigas
Sport in Canelones Department